The 2022 Offaly Senior Hurling Championship was the 124th staging of the Offaly Senior Hurling Championship since its establishment by the Offaly County Board in 1896. The group stage placings were confirmed on 28 May 2021. The championship ran from 24 June to 2 October 2022.

St Rynagh's entered the championship as the defending champions, however, they were beaten by Shinrone in the quarter-finals. Clodiagh Gaels were relegated after losing a playoff to Seir Kieran.

The final was played on 2 October 2022 at Bord na Móna O'Connor Park in Tullamore, between Shineorne and Kilcormac–Killoughey, in what was their first ever meeting in the final. Shinrone won the match by 0-26 to 2-13 to claim their first ever championship title.

Birr's Eoghan Cahill was the championship's top scorer with 1-64.

Group 1

Group 1 table

Group 2

Group 2 table

Knockout stage

Relegation playoff

Quarter-finals

Semi-finals

Final

Championship statistics

Top scorers

Overall

In a single game

References

Offaly Senior Hurling Championship
Offaly Senior Hurling Championship
Offaly Senior Hurling Championship